Sclerolobium is a genus of 40 species of flowering plants in the Leguminosae. It has been suggested that it should be merged with Tachigali.

Species

 Sclerolobium albiflorum Benoist
 Sclerolobium amplifolium Ducke
 Sclerolobium aureum (Tul.) Baill.
 Sclerolobium beaureipairei Harms
 Sclerolobium bracteosum Harms
 Sclerolobium chrysophyllum Poepp.
 Sclerolobium densiflorum Benth.
 Sclerolobium denudatum Vogel
 Sclerolobium duckei Dwyer
 Sclerolobium dwyeri Cowan
 Sclerolobium eriopetalum Ducke
 Sclerolobium friburgense Harms
 Sclerolobium froesii Pires
 Sclerolobium glaziovii Taub.
 Sclerolobium goeldianum Huber
 Sclerolobium guianense Benth.
 Sclerolobium herthae Harms
 Sclerolobium hypoleucum Benth.
 Sclerolobium leiocalyx Ducke
 Sclerolobium macropetalum Ducke
 Sclerolobium macrophyllum Vogel
 Sclerolobium melanocarpum Ducke
 Sclerolobium melinonii Harms
 Sclerolobium micranthum L.O.Williams
 Sclerolobium micropetalum Ducke
 Sclerolobium odoratissimum Benth
 Sclerolobium paniculatum Vogel
 Sclerolobium paraense Huber
 Sclerolobium physophorum Huber
 Sclerolobium pilgerianum Harms
 Sclerolobium pimichinense Cowan
 Sclerolobium prancei H.S.Irwin & Arroyo
 Sclerolobium reticulosum Dwyer
 Sclerolobium rigidum J.F.Macbr.
 Sclerolobium rugosum Benth.
 Sclerolobium setiferum Ducke
 Sclerolobium striatum Dwyer
 Sclerolobium subbullatum Ducke
 Sclerolobium tinctorium Benth.
 Sclerolobium urbanianum Harms

References

Fabaceae genera
Caesalpinioideae
Taxonomy articles created by Polbot